Beatrice is a 1921 Italian silent drama film directed by Herbert Brenon and starring Marie Doro and Sandro Salvini. It is based on the 1890 novel Beatrice by H. Rider Haggard and is also known by the alternative title of The Stronger Passion. It is a separate film from Brenon's 1919 Beatrice which starred Francesca Bertini as Beatrice Portinari.

The film's sets were designed by the art director Alfredo Manzi.

Cast
 Marie Doro as Beatrice  
 Sandro Salvini as Bingham  
 Marcella Sabbatini 
 Mina D'Orvella 
 Mimi 
 Angelo Gallina
 Silvana

References

Bibliography
 Phillips, Alastair & Vincendeau, Ginette. Journeys of Desire: European Actors in Hollywood. British Film Institute, 2006.

External links

1921 films
1921 drama films
Italian drama films
Films based on British novels
1920s Italian-language films
Films directed by Herbert Brenon
Italian silent feature films
Films based on works by H. Rider Haggard
Italian black-and-white films
Silent drama films
1920s Italian films